Richard A. Isaacson is a retired American physicist who has been cited by 2017 Nobel Laureate Rainer Weiss as indispensable to the LIGO gravitational wave project. Isaacson's 1967 PhD dissertation established that the theoretical gravitational waves had features similar to other known types of waves. Isaacson went on to champion the LIGO project as the NSF Program Director of Gravitational Physics for decades.  Weiss and fellow Laureate Kip Thorne have honored Isaacson by endowing the American Physical Society's  Richard A. Isaacson Award in Gravitational-Wave Science

References

Year of birth missing (living people)
Living people
American physicists